Ali bin Hamsa (29 August 1955 – 21 April 2022) was a Malaysian civil servant who served as the 13th Chief Secretary to the Government of Malaysia from 24 June 2012 to 30 August 2018.

Education 
Ali graduated with a Bachelor of Arts (Honours) from the University of Malaya before furthering his studies at Oklahoma State University, US, where he obtained a master's degree in Economics in 1986, followed by a PhD in Environmental Sciences and Economics in 1997.

Career 
Ali joined the Administrative and Diplomatic Service as an Assistant Director at the Ministry of Trade and Industry on 5 January 1981. In 1986, he was made Senior Project Manager, Economy and Public Policy Management at the National Institute of Public Administration, where he co-authored two books, namely Dasar-dasar Utama Kerajaan (1997) and Malaysia Kita (1998).

After a short stint at the Ministry of Transport in 1992, Ali furthered his studies and obtained his PhD in 1997. Upon returning from the US, he began serving at the Economic Planning Unit, Prime Minister's Department (PMD). He consecutively held the positions of Director of Disbursement Division and Deputy Director-General of the National Transformation and Advancement Programme.

On 22 April 2009, Ali was appointed the Director-General of the Public-Private Partnership (PPP) Unit, PMD, a central agency created to spearhead PPP initiatives, namely privatisation projects, private finance initiatives, corridor developments, and facilitation funds. He was sworn in as the Chief Secretary to the Government on 23 June 2012, before Prime Minister Najib Razak in Parliament.

As the Chief Secretary, Ali was the Chairman of the Malaysian Integrity Institute, Co-Chair of the Special Task Force to Facilitate Business, and Deputy Chairman of Johor Corporation. Ali was also a non-executive director of Bintulu Port Holdings Berhad, a member of the Penang Port Commission, and a member of the Board of Bumiputera Agenda Coordinating Unit.

In October 2017, Ali became the first Malaysian to receive an honorary science doctorate from the B.S. Abdur Rahman Crescent Institute of Science and Technology in Chennai, India.

Death
Ali died while receiving treatment at a hospital in Dublin, Ireland on 21 April 2022 at the age of 66. He was buried at the Precinct 20 Muslim Cemetery in Putrajaya.

Honours

Honours of Malaysia
  :
  Member of the Order of the Defender of the Realm (AMN) (2002)
  Officer of the Order of the Defender of the Realm (KMN) (2005)
  Commander of the Order of the Defender of the Realm (PMN) – Tan Sri (2013)
  :
  Grand Knight of the Order of the Territorial Crown (SUMW) – Datuk Seri Utama (2014)
  :
  Knight Grand Commander of the Order of the Crown of Johor (SPMJ) – Dato' (2013)
  :
  Knight Commander of the Order of Loyalty to Sultan Abdul Halim Mu'adzam Shah (DHMS) – Dato' Paduka (2015)
  :
  Knight Grand Commander of the Order of the Life of the Crown of Kelantan (SJMK) – Dato' (2012)
  :
  Knight Commander of the Exalted Order of Malacca (DCSM) – Datuk Wira (2011)
  Grand Commander of the Exalted Order of Malacca (DGSM) – Datuk Seri (2016)
  :
  Knight Commander of the Order of Loyalty to Negeri Sembilan (DPNS) – Dato' (2011)
  Grand Knight of the Order of Loyalty to Tuanku Muhriz (SSTM) – Dato' Seri (2013)
  :
  Knight Companion of the Order of the Crown of Pahang (DIMP) – Dato' (2006)
  Grand Knight of the Order of Sultan Ahmad Shah of Pahang (SSAP) – Dato' Sri (2009)
  :
  Knight Grand Commander of the Order of the Crown of Perlis (SPMP) – Dato' Seri (2017)
  :
  Knight Grand Commander of the Order of the Defender of State (DUPN) – Dato' Seri Utama (2014)
  :
  Grand Knight of the Order of Cura Si Manja Kini (SPCM) – Dato' Seri (2014)
  :
  Grand Commander of the Order of Kinabalu (SPDK) – Datuk Seri Panglima (2012)
  :
  Knight Commander of the Order of the Star of Sarawak (PNBS) – Dato Sri (2013)
  :
  Knight Grand Commander of the Order of the Crown of Selangor (SPMS) – Dato' Seri (2013)
  :
  Knight Grand Companion of the Order of Sultan Mizan Zainal Abidin of Terengganu (SSMZ) – Dato' Seri (2012)

References

External links 
 Chief Secretary's website

1955 births
2022 deaths
Knights Commander of the Most Exalted Order of the Star of Sarawak
People from Kluang
Malaysian people of Indian descent
Chief Secretaries to the Government of Malaysia
University of Malaya alumni
Oklahoma State University alumni
Knights Grand Commander of the Order of the Crown of Johor
Grand Commanders of the Order of Kinabalu
Commanders of the Order of the Defender of the Realm
Officers of the Order of the Defender of the Realm
Members of the Order of the Defender of the Realm
Knights Grand Commander of the Order of the Crown of Selangor